Kai Starr (real name Kaichi Satake) is an American author. He has written several books and drawn graphic novels in the science fiction and fantasy genres, but currently specializes in westerns. He is also a musician, and has recorded three albums of his original music. Kai Starr was raised in Texas and lives near Dallas.

His latest ongoing Desperado series of western novels and short stories have proved popular in internet serialization on his Outlaw Starr Anthology website. The serialized novels also have links to free MP3s of Starr's original music as soundtracks.

Novels

ShadowFall Universe (science fiction)
Legends of Maragon takes place in the same universe as the ShadowFall series that stars Genjiro Nakadai, though it predates those stories by five hundred years. The series centers on the royal families of the alien world of Maragon.

 Legends of Maragon (fantasy) 1980

ShadowFall series (science fiction)
The ShadowFall series follows the life of a young ninjutsu agent, Genjiro Nakadai, through his early years in training to his days as a seasoned—and cynical--assassin. The first book in the series, Into the Abyss, was also presented in graphic novel format on the Kyoki Press website.

 Into the Abyss 1986
 Blood of the Ninja 1989
 The Faraian Conspiracy 1990
 A Covenant of Shadows 1992

Desperado series (western)
The Desperado series is set in the American Old West, from the late 1860s to the mid-1870s. It follows the life and adventures of young outlaw, Joshua Love. Though not written first, Rustler's Roundup is the first book in the series.

 Whirlwind 2006
 Three Ways From Sunday 2007
 Rustler's Roundup 2008
 Desperado Dawn 2008
 Justice Rides In Leather 2009

Short stories
 Mutual Desires (fantasy) 1987
 The Janus Factor (sci-fi) 1989
 The Little Dragon (sci-fi, ShadowFall series) 1990
 Rapture (sci-fi) 1992
 Rana's Adventure (fantasy) 1993
 The Ghost House (supernatural), 2000
 Down at the GoGozeNe Bar (sci-fi, ShadowFall series) 2004
 To Catch an Elf (fantasy) 2005
 Land Lubberin' Fer Love (fantasy) 2005
 The Ballad of the Beam (western, Desperado series) 2008
 Judas Hearts (western, Desperado series) 2008
 Rubbin' Eyeballs With a Gunn (western, Desperado series) 2008

Graphic novels
 ShadowFall 1998-2002 Kyoki Press (web publisher)
 The Wings of Cranes and Eagles 1999 Kyoki Press (web publisher)

Albums 
 Monochrome Heart 2007 DragonSong Records
 Raw 2008 DragonSong Records
 Desperado (Soundtrack) 2009 DragonSong Records

External links
Kai Starr's Outlaw Starr Anthology site
Kyoki Press--Kai Starr/Kaichi Satake's webcomics
Kaichi Satake on ComicList's professional artists listing
Kai Starr's Homepage Jukebox
Kai Starr's RPM Record-an-album-in-a-month Challenge Profile
Kai Starr's jukebox page on RPM Challenge site
Kai Starr's albums on Last.fm

Western (genre) writers
20th-century American novelists
21st-century American novelists
American science fiction writers
American fantasy writers
American graphic novelists
Novelists from Texas
American male novelists
1964 births
Living people
American male short story writers
20th-century American short story writers
21st-century American short story writers
20th-century American male writers
21st-century American male writers